Koryong (also Koriong) is a village in the commune of Belel in the Adamawa Region of Cameroon.

Population 
In 1967, the settlement contained 177 inhabitants, mostly Fula people. By the time of the 2005 census, the population had increased to 445 people.

Infrastructure 
There is a weekly Sunday market.

References

Bibliography
 Jean Boutrais, 1993, Peuples et cultures de l'Adamaoua (Cameroun) : actes du colloque de Ngaoundéré du 14 au 16 janvier 1992, Paris : Éd. de l'ORSTOM u.a.
 Dictionnaire des villages de l'Adamaoua, ONAREST, Yaoundé, October 1974, 133 p.

External links
 Belel, on the website Communes et villes unies du Cameroun (CVUC)

Populated places in Adamawa Region